The 2021 Africa U-20 Cup of Nations is an international association football tournament held in Mauritania. The twelve national teams involved in the tournament were required to register a squad of 31 players; only players in these squads are eligible to take part in the tournament. Each player had to have been born after 1 January 2001. All ages as of start of the tournament. The squads for the 2021 Africa U-20 Cup of Nations were announced on 15 February 2021.

Group A

Cameroon
Head coach: Ousmanou Christophe

Mauritania

Mozambique

Uganda
Head coach: Morley Byekwaso

Group B

Burkina Faso

Central African Republic

Namibia
Head coach: James Britz

Tunisia
Head coach: Maher Kanzari

Group C

Gambia
Head coach: Mattar M'Boge

Ghana
Head coach: Abdul-Karim Zito

Morocco

Tanzania

References

2021 Africa U-20 Cup of Nations
Africa U-20 Cup of Nations squads